Simon Cowley (born 4 October 1980) is a former Australian breaststroke swimmer.

See also
 List of Commonwealth Games medallists in swimming (men)

References

1980 births
Living people
Australian male breaststroke swimmers
Swimmers at the 1998 Commonwealth Games
Commonwealth Games gold medallists for Australia
Commonwealth Games medallists in swimming
People educated at Endeavour Sports High School
Goodwill Games medalists in swimming
Competitors at the 2001 Goodwill Games
Medallists at the 1998 Commonwealth Games